The Teochew people or Chaoshan people (rendered Têo-Swa in romanized Teoswa and Chaoshan in Standard Chinese also known as Teo-Swa in mainland China due to a change in place names) is anyone native to the historical Chaoshan region in south China who speak the Teo-Swa Min (Chaoshan) language (typified by the Chaozhou dialect). Today, most Chaoshan people live throughout Chaoshan and Hong Kong, and also outside China in Southeast Asia, including in Singapore, Malaysia, Thailand, Cambodia, Vietnam, and the Philippines. The community can also be found in diasporas around the world, including the United States, Canada, Australia, New Zealand, and France.

Terms
Chaoshan can be romanized in a variety of schemes, and are known in Mandarin as Cháoshan rén and in Cantonese as Chiushan yan. In referring to themselves as ethnic Chinese, Chaoshan people generally use Deung nang, as opposed to Hang nang.

Chaoshan people of the diaspora would generally use ting nang to indicate Chinese heritage in a cultural sense. tingnang and tangren are broadly used by most of the southern Chinese people living outside of China, referring to their maintaining a substantial cultural identity they consider to be Chinese.  The identification of "tingnang" could perhaps be due to their early affiliation with the Tang dynasty.  The Teochew people are those who speak the Teochew dialect and identify with Teochew culture, cuisine, and customs.

Teochew people also commonly refer to each other as ga gi nang.

History
The ancestors of the Chaoshan people moved to present-day Chaoshan as refugees possibly from central China due to various reasons. The Teochews were often called Fulao (Hoklo) because they came mostly passed through Fujian during migration, with some well-maintained language and customs from ancient China. As was recorded in pedigrees and ancient inscriptions, one of the two groups of those who temporarily migrated to the capital city of Fujian later moved to parts of Chaoshan instead in batches during the Tang Dynasty, genetically intermixing with the local people within Chaoshan there.

The Chaoshan people are mistakenly known to the Cantonese as "Hoklo", literally meaning "men of Fujian", although the term "Teochew" was used in the Straits Settlements in the 19th century and early 20th century. "Teochew" is derived from Teochew prefecture (Chaozhou Fu) the departmental city where they originate.

Teochew immigration to Singapore

From the 19th century, significant numbers of Teochew people left their homeland for Singapore and a new life. Early Teochew settlers could trace their origins to eight counties/prefectures: Chao'an, Chenghai, Chaoyang, Jieyang, Raoping, Puning, Huilai and Nan'ao. In addition to these new immigrants from the port of Swatow (Shantou), Teochew immigrants from Siam and the Riau Islands also began settling in Singapore after 1819.

Today, Teochew is the second-most spoken Chinese dialect in Singapore. They are the second-largest Chinese dialect group in Singapore, comprising 21% of the Chinese population. As a result, they play a significant role in commerce and politics.

Teochew in Taiwan

Most of the Teochew descendants in Taiwan have already been "hokkienized" ("hoklonized"). They speak the Taiwanese Hokkien language instead of Teochew, but some Teochew are still in Chaozhou township, in Pingtung County.

A 1926 Japanese census found that 134,800 people in Taiwan were of Teochew ancestry.

Culture

Throughout a history of over 1000 years, the region of Chaoshan, known in ancient times as Teochew Prefecture, has developed and cultivated a prestigious culture, which manifests its unique characteristics in language, opera, cuisine, tea practice, music, and embroidery.

The Teochew language is spoken by roughly 10 million people in Chaoshan and more than five million outside the Chinese mainland.

Chaoshan cuisine is known for its distinctive sauces, seafood dishes, and stews.

Teochew opera is a traditional art form, which has a history of more than 500 years and is now enjoyed by 20 million Teochew people in over 20 countries and regions. Based on local folk dances and ballads, Teochew opera has formed its own style under the influence of Nanxi Opera. Nanxi is one of the oldest Chinese operas and originated in the Song Dynasty. The old form of choral accompaniment still preserves its distinctive features. Clowns and females are the most distinctive characters in Teochew opera, and fan play and acrobatic skills are prominent.

Teochew music is popular in Chaoshan's teahouse scene. The Teochew string instrument, gong, drum, and traditional Chinese flute are typically involved in ensembles. The current Chaozhou drum music is said to be similar to the Drum and Wind Music form of the Han and Tang dynasties.

Teochew woodcarving is a form of Chinese woodcarving originating from Chaoshan. Teochew people used a great deal of Teochew wood carving in their buildings.

Yingge dance is a form of Chinese folk dance originating in the Ming dynasty. It is one of the most representative forms of Teochew folk arts.

Although few movies or television dramas have been made about the Teochew people, one such notable drama is the Singaporean 1995 drama series The Teochew Family. In 2019, Netflix released the documentary series Flavorful Origins, which focused on Teochew cuisine.

Notable Teochew people

Politicians

Leaders
Chatichai Choonhavan, Prime Minister of Thailand; 1988–1991.
Banharn Silpa-archa (馬德祥), Prime Minister of Thailand; 1995–1996

Cabinet ministry
Bhichai Rattakul (陳裕財), President of the National Assembly, Speaker of the House of Representatives, Deputy Prime Minister of Thailand.
Chumpol Silpa-archa, Deputy Prime Minister of Thailand, Minister of Tourism and Sports, Minister of Education.
Kalaya Sophonpanich (龍宛虹), Minister of Science and Technology of Thailand.
Korn Dabbaransi, Deputy Prime Minister of Thailand, Minister of Office of the Prime Minister, Minister of Science and Technology, Minister of Public Health, Minister of Industry.
Bhichit Rattakul, Governor of Bangkok.
Alice Wong, Minister of Business, Minister of Seniors of Canada.
Lim Boon Heng (林文興), Minister in the Prime Minister's Office, Minister without portfolio.
Lim Swee Say (林瑞生), Minister in the Prime Minister's Office, Minister for Manpower, Minister for the Environment of Singapore.
Teo Chee Hean (張志賢), Senior Minister of Singapore, Coordinating Minister for National Security, Deputy Prime Minister of Singapore, Minister for Education, Minister for Defence.
Tan Soo Khoon (陳樹群), Speaker of the Parliament of Singapore.
Varawut Silpa-archa, Minister of Natural Resources and Environment of Thailand.
Koh Poh Koon (许宝琨), Senior Minister for Environment, Manpower, Trade and Industry of Singapore.

Others
Kraisak Choonhavan, member of Thailand parliament.
Gladys Liu (廖嬋娥), Member of Parliament for Chisholm, Australia.

Businesspeople and entrepreneurs
Chin Sophonpanich (陳弼臣), founded Bangkok Bank and Bangkok Insurance.
Vincent Lo (羅康瑞), founder and chairman of Shui On Group.
Lim Por-yen (林百欣), founded the Lai Sun Group.
Goh Cheng Liang, billionaire businessman, founded Wuthelam Holdings, which manufactures paint and coatings.
Charoen Sirivadhanabhakdi (蘇旭明), Billionaire, founder of Thai Beverage, and the chairman of conglomerates TCC Group and Fraser and Neave.
Krit Ratanarak (李智正), chairman of Bangkok Broadcasting & Television Company.
Joseph Lau (劉鑾雄), founder, chairman, and CEO of Chinese Estates Group.
Thomas Lau (劉鑾鴻), CEO of Lifestyle International Holdings which operates Hong Kong's largest department, Sogo Hong Kong.
Peter Lam (林建岳), billionaire and chairman of the Hong Kong Trade Development Council.
Chartsiri Sophonpanich (陳智深), President of Bangkok Bank.
Ma Huateng (馬化騰), one of the top ten richest men in the world, with an estimated net worth of US$55.3 billion. He is the founder, chairman, and CEO of Tencent.
Thapana Sirivadhanabhakdi, CEO and president of ThaiBev.

Actors and singers
Chen Shucheng, actor and host.
Tan Kheng Hua, actress
Canti Lau, actor and singer.
Zoe Tay, actress and former model.
Chen Hanwei, actor.
Joe Ma (actor), actor.
Ada Choi, actress.
 James Ma
Lucas Wong, rapper, singer, and model.
Jessica Henwick, actress, director and writer.
Ellen Wong, actress.

See also
 Poh Teck Tung Foundation: Teochew religious charitable group in Thailand
 Yueh Hai Ching Temple: Oldest Teochew temple in Singapore
 Ngee Ann Kongsi: Teochew charitable group in Singapore
 Thai Chinese
 Taishanese people
 Lingnan culture
 Lingnan

Notes

References and further reading
 Gia Lim Tan, "Origins," An Introduction to the Culture and History of the Teochews in Singapore,"   World Scientific, 2018.

External links
 Gaginang, a teochew nonprofit organization
 Singapore Teochew Federation for Businesses & Associations

Subgroups of the Han Chinese
 
Hong Kong people